Henning Scheich (born 12 May 1942 in Wuppertal) is a German brain researcher and psychiatrist. He was director of the Leibniz Institute for Neurobiology until 2010 and head of the institute department until 2013. Since 2014 he serves as the chairman of an emeritus group at the institute. He has made substantial contributions to the field of brain research, in particular on the mechanisms of perception, behaviour and their adaptability. Within the framework of the Gottfried Wilhelm Leibniz Science Association he has exerted a lasting influence on the German community of researchers.

Life 

After finishing school at the Geschwister-Scholl-Gymnasium in Düsseldorf, Scheich studied medicine and philosophy at the University of Cologne (1961–63), at Munich (1963–64 and 1965–66) and Montpellier, France (1964–65). He concluded his medicine studies with the State examination at the University of Munich in 1966.
From 1967 to 1969 Scheich worked as a PhD student on the human electroencephalogram (EEG) at the Max Planck Institute for Psychiatry Munich in the department run by Otto Detlev Creutzfeldt. He completed his PhD degree with highest praise (summa cum laude) in 1969. While working on his PhD, he published a series of scientific works on the physiology of the visual system of cats.

From 1969 to 1972 Scheich served as post-doctoral student under Theodore H. Bullock at the University of California in San Diego, USA. Here he participated in the research on the Jamming avoidance response, a characteristic of Behavioral communication among electric fish and on its neurophysiological foundations. From 1972 to 1974 Scheich led a research group at the Max Planck Institute for Biophysical Chemistry, Göttingen, on the subject of acoustic communication.

In 1974, Scheich accepted a professorship for zoology  and neurobiology at the Technische Universität Darmstadt. Between 1977 and 1985 he undertook field research trips to the Amazon basin, central Africa and Thailand, where he studied electric fish and the Behavioral communication of birds, that led to the discovery of Ultrasonic hearing. Scheich was guest professor at the Ponce Health Sciences University in Puerto Rico and joint the Australian National University Canberra, for a research period, during which time he discovered the electric sensory organ of the platypus.

After German reunification and the foundation of the Gottfried Wilhelm Leibniz Science Association in 1992, Scheich was appointed director and head of the department at the Leibniz Institute for Neurobiology (IfN, since 2010 LIN) in Magdeburg, that included a professorship for physiology at the medical faculty of the Otto-von-Guericke University. The LIN, that has originated from an institute of the Scientific Academy of the GDR (East Germany), focuses on research into the mechanisms of learning and memory. The research program of Scheich at the LIN concentrated on the organisation of auditory and vocal behaviour in animals and humans and in this context on the role of the Auditory cortex during learning events. In 2003 Scheich participated in the establishment of the annual International Conference on Auditory Cortex event.
Scheich’s tenure as the director of the LIN ended in 2010. During the same year he also retired from the Otto-von-Guericke University. From 2014 to 2018 Scheich has continued his work with his emeritus group.

Scheich has missed no opportunity to publicly emphasize the significance of brain research for human education and was involved in organizations associated with research support, the self-administration of science and political counselling (e.g. the so-called ‘Blue List’ Committee, the Evaluation Committee of the German Council of Science and Humanities, the Heisenberg Committee of the German Research Foundation, the Health Research Council of the Federal Ministry of Education and Research).

Honors and memberships 
 1995 to 2003 – Vice president of the Gottfried Wilhelm Leibniz Science Association
 2000 – Berlin-Brandenburg Academy of Sciences and Humanities
 2007 – Order of Merit of Saxony-Anhalt
 2013 – Golden Book of the City of Magdeburg

Publications on Auditory cortex research

References

External links
 
International Conference on Auditory Cortex

Editorships
 Editorial Board of the journal Neurobiology of Learning and Memory
 The Auditory Cortex: A Synthesis of Human and Animal Research. Editors Reinhard König; Peter Heil; Eike Budinger; Henning Scheich. Lawrence Erlbaum Assoc. Mahwah, New Jersey, 2005.
 The Neocortex: Ontogeny and Phylogeny. Nato Science Series A. Editors Barbara L. Finlay, Giorgio M. Innocenti, Henning Scheich.

1942 births
Living people
21st-century German biologists
German neuroscientists
20th-century German biologists
Scientists from Wuppertal
Academic staff of Technische Universität Darmstadt